Charles Christian, Prince of Nassau-Weilburg (Weilburg, 16 January 1735 – Münster-Dreissen, near Kirchheim, 28 November 1788), till 1753 Count of Nassau-Weilburg, was the first ruler of the Principality of Nassau-Weilburg between 1753 and 1788.

Family and rule
He was the son of Charles August, Prince of Nassau-Weilburg and Princess Auguste Friederike of Nassau-Idstein. He succeeded his father in 1753 and united his territories in 1783 with Nassau-Saarbrücken, Nassau-Usingen and Nassau-Dietz.

Marriage
He married on 5 March 1760 in The Hague Princess Carolina of Orange-Nassau (1743–1787), daughter of William IV, Prince of Orange and Anne, Princess Royal.

He became a general in the Dutch infantry, governor of Bergen op Zoom and governor of Maastricht (1773–1784). He negotiated in vain with the Patriots in 1787.

After the death of his wife, he concluded a morganatic marriage with Barbara Giessen von Kirchheim. He died in 1788 and was succeeded by his eldest surviving son Frederick William.

Children
He and Carolina had 15 children, some of whom became ancestors of 19th century royalty:
 Georg Wilhelm Belgicus, Hereditary Prince of Nassau-Weilburg (The Hague, 18 December 1760 – Honselaarsdijk, 27 May 1762).
 Wilhelm Ludwig Karl, Hereditary Prince of Nassau-Weilburg (The Hague, 12 December 1761 – Kirchheim, 16 April/26 April 1770).
 Princess Auguste Marie Karoline of Nassau-Weilburg (The Hague, 5 February 1764 – Weilburg, 25 January 1802). A deaconess in Quedlinburg and Herford.
 Princess Wilhelmine Luise of Nassau-Weilburg (The Hague, 28 September 1765 – Greiz, 10 October 1837), married in Kirchheim on 9 January 1786 Heinrich XIII, Prince Reuss of Greiz (Greiz, 16 February 1747 – Greiz, 29 January 1817), and had issue:
 Prince Heinrich XVIII Reuss of Greiz (31 March 1787 – 31 March 1787), the only grandchild of Charles Christian who was born in his lifetime.
 Heinrich XIX, Prince Reuss of Greiz (1 March 1790 – 31 October 1836), married in 1822 to Princess Gasparine of Rohan-Rochefort, had issue.
 Heinrich XX, Prince Reuss of Greiz (29 June 1794 – 8 November 1859), married firstly in 1834 to Princess Sophie of Löwenstein-Wertheim-Rosenberg, no issue, Princess Sophie died in 1838; Married secondly in 1839 to Landgravine Karoline of Hesse-Homburg, had issue.
 Stillborn son (The Hague, 22 October 1767).
 Frederick William, Prince of Nassau-Weilburg (25 October 1768, The Hague – 9 January 1816).
 Princess Karoline Luise Friederike of Nassau-Weilburg (Kirchheim, 14 February 1770 – Wiesbaden, 8 July 1828), married in Kirchheim on 4 September 1787 Karl Ludwig, Prince zu Wied (Dierdorf, 9 September 1763 – Dierdorf, 9 March 1824), without issue.
 Prince Karl Ludwig of Nassau-Weilburg (Kirchheim, 19 July 1772 – Kirchheim, 27 July 1772).
 Prince Karl Friedrich Wilhelm of Nassau-Weilburg (Kirchheim, 1 May 1775 – Weilburg, 11 May 1807), unmarried and without issue.
 Princess Amelia Charlotte Wilhelmine Luise of Nassau-Weilburg (Kirchheim, 7 August 1776 – Schaumburg, 19 February 1841), married firstly in Weilburg on 29 October 1793 Victor II, Prince of Anhalt-Bernburg-Schaumburg-Hoym, and had issue, and married secondly in Schaumburg on 15 February 1813 Friedrich, Baron von Stein-Liebenstein zu Barchfeld (14 February 1777 – 4 December 1849), and had issue.
 Stillborn daughter (Kirchheim, 21 October 1778).
 Child (1779–1779).
 Princess Henriette of Nassau-Weilburg (22 April 1780 – 2 January 1857). Married Duke Louis of Württemberg, second son of Friedrich II Eugen, Duke of Württemberg.
 Child (.. November 1784 - died shortly thereafter).
 Child (.. November 1785 - died shortly thereafter).

Ancestors

References

External links

House of Nassau-Weilburg
1735 births
1788 deaths
People from Weilburg